Snovsk Raion , until May 2016 Shchors Raion , was a raion (district) of Chernihiv Oblast, northern Ukraine. Its administrative centre was located at the town of Snovsk. The raion was abolished on 18 July 2020 as part of the administrative reform of Ukraine, which reduced the number of raions of Chernihiv Oblast to five. The area of Snovsk Raion was merged into Koriukivka Raion The last estimate of the raion population was 

On 21 May 2016, Verkhovna Rada adopted decision to rename Shchors Raion to Snovsk Raion  and Shchors to Snovsk according to the law prohibiting names of Communist origin.

At the time of disestablishment, the raion consisted of one hromada, Snovsk urban hromada with the administration in Snovsk.

References

Former raions of Chernihiv Oblast
1923 establishments in Ukraine
Ukrainian raions abolished during the 2020 administrative reform